Smoke N Mirrors is the debut solo album by American rapper B-Real of Cypress Hill. It was released on February 24, 2009 through Duck Down Records with distribution via Koch Entertainment. Production was handled by Jay Turner, Scoop DeVille, Soopafly, Alchemist, Fifth, Salam Wreck, Sick Jacken and B-Real himself. It features guest appearances from Young De, Babydoll Refresh, Bo-Roc, Tek Nizzle, Buckshot, Damian Marley, Kurupt, Mal Verde, Sen Dog, Sick Jacken, Snoop Dogg, Too $hort, Trace Midas and Xzibit.

The album peaked at number 97 in Switzerland, number 142 in France, and number 148 in the United States.

Track listing 

Sample credits
"Smoke N Mirrors" contains a sample of "Children of the Night" by The Stylistics
"Don't Ya Dare Laugh" contains a sample of "Tom's Diner" by Suzanne Vega
"6 Minutes" contains a sample of "Captain Scarlet & the Mysterons Theme" by Barry Gray
"Fire" contains a sample of "Posse on Broadway" by Sir Mix-a-Lot

Personnel

Louis Freese – vocals, producer (tracks: 7, 10, 12), executive producer
Bo Roc – vocals (tracks: 1, 2)
Demrick Ferm – vocals (tracks: 3, 5, 8, 10, 15)
Alvin Nathaniel Joiner – vocals (track 3)
Kenyatta Blake – vocals (track 4), co-executive producer
Daniel Wayne – vocals (tracks: 5, 8)
Joaquin Gonzalez – vocals & producer (track 6)
Damian "Jr. Gong" Marley – vocals (track 7)
Babydoll Refresh – vocals (tracks: 9, 14)
Calvin Cordozar Broadus Jr. – vocals (track 10)
Trace Midas – vocals (track 10)
Senen Reyes – vocals (track 12)
Mal Verde – vocals (track 12)
Ricardo Emmanuel Brown – vocals (track 15)
Todd Anthony Shaw – vocals (track 15)
Elijah Blue Molina – producer (tracks: 1, 3)
Priest "Soopafly" Brooks – producer (tracks: 2, 4)
Daniel Alan Maman – producer (track 5)
Jay Turner – producer (tracks: 8, 11, 13, 15), executive producer
Fifth – producer (track 9)
Salam Nassar – producer (track 14)
Richard "Segal" Huredia – engineering
Drew "Dru-Ha" Friedman – co-executive producer
Estevan Oriol – artwork, design, photography
Lucky Alvarez – design, layout
Sam Skrilla – additional artwork

Charts

References

External links

B-Real albums
2009 debut albums
Duck Down Music albums
Albums produced by Soopafly
Albums produced by Scoop DeVille
Albums produced by the Alchemist (musician)